Baramulla, also known as Varmul in Kashmiri, is a city and a municipality in the Baramulla district in the Indian union territory of Jammu and Kashmir. It is also the administrative headquarters of the Baramulla district, located on the banks of the River Jhelum downstream from Srinagar, the summer capital of Jammu and Kashmir. The town was earlier known as gateway of Kashmir, serving as the major distribution centre for goods arriving in Kashmir valley through the Jhelum valley cart road.

The town was earlier known as Vārāhamūla. The name is derived from two Sanskrit words, Vārāha (meaning wild boar) and Mūla (meaning root/origin). The town was a major urban settlement and trade centre, before suffering extensive damage during the 1947 Pakistani tribal invasion of Kashmir. Currently, Baramulla is a major centre of business and education in Northern Kashmir. Majority of the media persons, journalist across Kashmir belong to this district like Syed Shujaat Bukhari, Itifaq Lone, Gulzar Ahmad Zargar, Sajad Hussain Per, Asim Mohiuddin..

Origin
The name Baramulla is derived from the Sanskrit Varāhamūla (वराहमूल), a combination of varaha (boar) and mūla (root or deep) meaning "boar's molar."

According to Hindu mythology, the Kashmir Valley was once a lake known as Satisaras (Parvati's Lake in Sanskrit). Ancient Hindu texts relate that the lake was occupied by the demon Jalodbhava (meaning "originated from water") until Lord Vishnu assumed the form of a boar and struck the mountain at Varahamula. This created an opening for the water to flow out of the lake.

The modern Baramulla was called Varahamulaksetra or Varahaksetra in the ancient days. Originally, it was a suburb of Huviskapura (modern Ushkur). Associated with the Adivaraha, the boar incarnation of Vishnu, it was considered very sacred. Consequently, many temples and monasteries were built in the ninth and tenth centuries, during the region of Lalitaditya Muktapida, (Queen) Sugandha, and Ksemagupta, when the worship of Vishnu flourished there.

History

Ancient and medieval

The city of Baramulla was founded by Raja Bhimsina in 2306 B.C. A number of visitors have traveled to Baramulla, including Xuanzang from China and a British historian named Moorcraft. Additionally, Mughal emperors were fascinated by Baramulla. Gateway of the Kashmir Valley, Baramulla was a way station during their visits to the valley. In 1508 A.D., Emperor Akbar, who entered the valley via Pakhil, spent several days at Baramulla. According to Tarikh-e-Hassan, the city was decorated during Akbar's stay. Emperor Jahangir stayed at Baramulla during his visit to Kashmir in 1620.

From the beginning, Baramulla has had religious importance. Hindu Teertha and Buddhist Vihars (monasteries) made the city sacred to both Hindus and Buddhists. During the 15th century, it became important to Muslims as well. Syed Janbaz Wali, who visited the valley with his companions in 1421, chose Baramulla as the center of his mission and was later buried there. His shrine attracts pilgrims from throughout the valley.

In 1620, the sixth Sikh Guru, Shri Hargobind, visited the city. In Baramulla Hindus, Muslims, Buddhists, and Sikhs lived in harmony and contributed to its culture.

Baramulla was the oldest and most-important town in northern Kashmir and Jammu (princely state) and "Gateway to the Kashmir Valley" (by the Rawalpindi-Murree-Muzaffarabad-Baramulla Road) until 27 October 1947. It was ceded to India when the Maharajah signed the instrument of accession on 26 October 1947. The city is the headquarters of the Baramulla district.

October 1947

Pashtun tribesmen from the South Waziristan region of Pakistan attacked Kashmir to seize the state. They moved along the Rawalpindi-Murree-Muzaffarabad-Baramulla Road on 22 October 1947. They were assisted by Pakistani soldiers in civilian clothes. Muzaffarabad fell on 24 October 1947, and the soldiers captured Baramulla the following day. Satrina village in Baramulla, Ichama and Atna village in Budgam were chosen by Indian Sikhs to fight off the invaders. It was because of Sikhs, the invaders were not able to reach and capture Srinagar airport on time and their delay helped Indian army Patiala regiment to land and push the invaders back.

They also raped and killed Christian Missionary Nuns and nurses at St Joseph's Hospital on their way to Srinagar airport. According to Tariq Ali, the local cinema became a "rape center", with atrocities continuing for several days.

On the morning of 27 October, India airlifted troops from Delhi to the Srinagar airfield while the tribal forces were still at Baramulla, harassing and looting the people.

Reports 
Aastair Lamb wrote in Incomplete Partition, Roxford 1997, pp. 186–187:
The (tribal) leaders completely lost control over their men, an orgy of killing was the result. This was certainly the case at St Joseph's College, Convent and Hospital, the site of what was to become one of the most publicised incidents of the entire Kashmir conflict. Here nuns, priests and congregation, including patients in the hospital, were slaughtered; and at the same time a small number of Europeans, notably Lt. Colonel D.O. Dykes and his wife, an Englishwoman preparing to leave the hospital that day with her new-born baby, Mother Teresalina, a twenty-nine-year-old Spanish nun who had been in Baramulla only a few weeks, as well as Mother Aldertrude, the Assistant Mother Superior, and one Mr Jose Barretto, husband of the doctor, met their deaths at tribal hands.

Charles Chevenix Trench wrote in The Frontier Scouts (1985):
In October 1947... tribal lashkars hastened in lorries – undoubtedly with official logistic support – into Kashmir... at least one British Officer, Harvey-Kelly took part in the campaign. It seemed that nothing could stop these hordes of tribesmen taking Srinagar with its vital airfield. Indeed nothing did, but their own greed. The Mahsuds in particular stopped to loot, rape and murder; Indian troops were flown in and the lashkars pushed out of the Vale of Kashmir into the mountains. The Mahsuds returned home in a savage mood, having muffed an easy chance, lost the loot of Srinagar and made fools of themselves.Sam Manekshaw (later a field marshal) was a colonel in the Directorate of Military Operations who went to Srinagar with V. P. Menon to assess the situation on 26 October 1947. He later told in an interview:Fortunately for Kashmir, the tribals were busy raiding, raping all along. In Baramulla they killed Colonel D.O.T. Dykes. Dykes and I were of the same seniority. We did our first year's attachment with the Royal Scots in Lahore, way back in 1934-5. Tom went to the Sikh regiment. I went to the Frontier Force regiment. We'd lost contact with each other. He'd become a lieutenant colonel. I'd become a full colonel. Tom and his wife were holidaying in Baramulla when the tribesmen killed them. 

Tom Cooper of the Air Combat Information Group wrote, "The Pathans appeared foremost interested in looting, killing, ransacking and other crimes against the inhabitants instead of a serious military action."

According to Mohammad Akbar Khan (Colonel, Pakistan army, who was promoted as Brigadier and made in charge of sending the tribals to Kashmir and who had been a contemporary of Col. Dykes at Royal Military College, Sandhurst) in his War for Kashmir in 1947, "The uncouth raiders delayed in Baramulla for two (whole) days ."

Biju Patnaik (later Chief Minister of Odisha) piloted the first plane to land at Srinagar airport that morning. He brought 17 soldiers from the 1st Sikh Regiment, commanded by Lt. Col. Dewan Ranjit Rai. The pilot flew low over the airstrip twice to ensure that no raiders were around. Instructions from Prime Minister Nehru's office were clear: If the airport was taken over by the enemy, they were not to land. Taking a full circle, the DC-3 flew at ground level. Soldiers peered from the aircraft and found the airstrip empty. The raiders were too busy distributing the war booty among themselves in Baramulla.

Lt. Col. Dewan Ranjit Rai immediately moved with his small platoon towards Baramulla hoping to stop the tribal raiders at the mouth of the funnel which opens 5 km east of Baramula into a wide valley. He led his men from the front and died of bullet wound the same day, 27 October 1947, at Patan but delayed the raiders for a day. As more Indian troops flew into Srinagar the next day, they started pushing the raiders back. It took two weeks for the Indian army to evict the raiders (who had been joined by Pakistani regulars and were well-entrenched) from Baramulla on 9 November 1947.

Sheikh Mohammad Abdullah spoke to the UN Security Council on 5 February 1948: "The raiders came to our land, massacred thousands of people – mostly Sikhs, but Hindus and Muslims, too – abducted thousands of girls, Hindus, Sikhs and Muslims alike, looted our property and almost reached the gates of our summer capital, Srinagar."

Robert Trumbull, The New York Times, 10 Nov 1947; reporting from Baramulla [UN doc # S/PV.762/Add.1/Annex 1/No. 26]:

The raid of the convent is narrated in even gory details by Father Shanks, one of the fortunate survivors and the anonymous 'witnesses' in the following report.

"The tribesmen - great, wild, black beasts they were - came shooting their way down from the hills on both sides of the town. They climbed over the hospital walls from all sides. The first group burst into a ward firing at the patients. A 20-year-old Indian nurse, Philomena, tried to protect a Muslim patient whose baby had just been born. She was shot dead first. The Patient was next. Mother Superior Aldetude rushed into the ward, knelt over Philomena and was at once attacked and robbed. The Assistant Mother, Teresalina, saw a tribesman point a rifle at Mother Aldetrude and jumped in front of her. A bullet went through Teresalina's heart. At the moment Colonel Dykes, who had assured us we would not be attacked, raced from his room a few yards along the terrace to get the Mother Superior out of danger, shouting at the tribesmen as he ran. But the Mother Superior fell shot, and Colonel Dykes collapsed beside her with a bullet in the stomach. Mrs Dykes ran from her husband's room to help him. She too was shot dead.

While this went on, Mr Gee Boretto, an Anglo-Indian, was killed in the garden before nine Christian Nuns. Then the nuns were lined up before a firing squad. As the tribesmen raised their rifles a young Afridi Officer, who once studied in a Convent School at Peshawar, rushed in and stopped them. At least there are living features of human quality in these incidents. He had been told his men were raiding a Convent, and had run all the way from the town. That saved all our lives by a few seconds.

We did not find Mrs Dykes until the following day. She had been thrown down a well."

Father Shank of the Convent [UN doc # S/PV.762/Add.1/Annex 1/No. 27]:

"Their buses and trucks, loaded with booty, arrived every other day and took more Pathans to Kashmir. Ostensibly they wanted to liberate their Kashmir Muslim brothers, but their primary objective was to riot and loot. In this they made no distinction between Hindu, Sikhs and Muslims. The raiders advanced in Baramulla, the biggest commercial centre of the region with a population of 11,000 until they were only an hour away from Srinagar. For the next three days they were engaged in massive plunder, rioting and rape. No one was spared. Even members of the St. Joseph's Mission Hospital were brutally massacred."

- 'Half Way to Freedom' by Margaret Bourke-White

Andrew Whitehead, who was BBC correspondent in India, reported on the October 1947 atrocities in Baramulla, particularly on the Christian mission convent and hospital, in his book "A Mission in Kashmir".

Recent years
The road network has been improved in Baramulla since 1947, and better educational facilities have been created. Bridges on the Jhelum River have been built (or are planned) to connect the old town on the north bank of the river with the new town on the south bank. Urban renewal in the old town has been attempted by moving residents to the new town. Uptown Baramulla is a developed locality with shopping complexes and posh housing colonies. Baramulla is connected by rail with Srinagar, Anantnag, Qazigund and Banihal.

Geography
Baramulla is on the Jhelum River, at its highest point. Baramulla tehsil is stretched from Village Khushalpora in the east to village Boniyar in the west. The old town is on the north bank of the river, and the new town is on the south bank. They are connected by five bridges, including a suspension bridge connecting Gulnar Park and Dewan Bagh. Five more bridges are being built or are planned. A bridge will connect the Khanpora and Drangbal areas of the city.

The old town is densely populated and smaller than the new town. Government offices, hospitals, the bus station and most other facilities are in the new town. The Baramulla railway station is on the eastern end of the new town, on the river. Beyond the old town, the river divides into two channels at Khadanyar (near police headquarters), forming an island known as Eco Park.

Baramulla is located at 34.2° N 74.34° E . It has an average elevation of 1,593 meters (5,226 feet).

Climate
Baramulla has a humid subtropical climate, with cold, snowy winters and hot summers.

Demographics

Baramulla is the fourth-most populous city in Jammu and Kashmir state. Baramulla's old town is known as Shehr-e-Khas, and its new town as Greater Baramulla. 

 India census, Baramulla had a population of 71,434. There were 38,677 males (54%) and 32,757 females (46%). Of the population, 8,878 (12.4%) were age 0-6: 4,851 males (55%) and 4,027 females (45%).  The literacy rate for the people over six was 79.6% (males 87.3%, females 70.6%).

Languages
The most commonly-used languages are Kashmiri and Urdu, followed by English, Pahari, Hindko, Gujari and Punjabi.

Education
St. Joseph's School is one of the oldest missionary schools in  Kashmir. Other notable schools include Delhi Public School,Aarifeen School of Excellence, Baramulla Public School, GD Goenka Public School,Dagger Parivar School, Beacon House School, two Hanfia Model High Schools: Delina-B and Ushkura, Budding Bloom Experimental School,Islamia high school , Guru Nanak Dev School,Faizan Public School among others.

Baramulla has a number of government-run schools. Higher secondary schools are known as intermediate colleges. There are separate higher secondary schools for boys and girls further one Higher Secondary School in old Town, Baramulla has a Kendriya Vidyalaya, Navodaya Vidayala in Shahkot and Sainik (military) school, both affiliated with the Central Board of Secondary Education.

Baramulla has separate government degree colleges for men and women, and a medical college associated with the district hospital. The north campus of the University of Kashmir is located outskirts the Baramulla town, and an engineering college has been established. CIIIT is only Institute in kashmir valley which is located in kanispora area of Baramulla

Baramulla has the government Baramulla Polytechnic College, which was established in 2012. It is in the Kanispora area of Baramulla city. The polytechnic teaches three-year diploma courses in electrical engineering and architecture. Government Medical college Baramulla has started functioning the normal classes since August 2018.

Healthcare
Baramulla has District Medical Hospital and District Veterinary Hospital, with radiology (x-ray) and ultrasonography facilities. A new building for the veterinary hospital, is under construction which is near to completion and has got the indoor facilities for the pet animal patients.The District Medical Hospital is 300 bedded hospital and has all the specialization facilities available.

Baramulla has a privately run facility for mothers and child hospital called St Joseph's Hospital. It was started in 1921 and is running smoothly to the entire satisfaction of the populace.

Government Medical College, Baramulla was inaugurated in year 2018 and started its function from its first batch in year 2019.

Eco Park
Eco Park is on the island in the middle of Jhelum river on the road from Baramulla town to Uri. It is approached by a wooden bridge. It was developed by J&K Tourism Development Corporation with a blend of modern substructure and natural exquisiteness. This ecological tourism park offers a view with mountains in the background, Jhelum river flowing along the island, and lush, green, well-maintained gardens with some beautifully designed wooden huts. It is one of the best places to visit in the Baramulla and is a popular destination for locals particularly on summer evenings; it is developing into a major tourist attraction as well.

A cable car project and expansion of Eco Park are planned.

Transport

Road

From Srinagar
National Highway NH-1 starting from the Line of Control and passing through Uri connects the city with Srinagar and continues to Leh. NH-1 was formerly called NH-1A before renumbering of all national highways by National Highway Authority of India in 2010 year. NH-1 joins NH-44 at Srinagar. Taxi and bus service is available from Srinagar and Jammu. The road from Srinagar to Baramulla is regarded as the best motorable and best maintained road in the valley. It is a boulevard surrounded by breathtaking rice fields and meadows. It passes through Sangrama, Wagoora, Hygam, Pattan and Zainakot.

Baramulla is well connected to Kupwara by NH701 National Highway and also connected to Gulmarg by another National Highway NH701A

From Uri and Muzaffarabad
The  road from Muzaffarabad to Baramulla runs along the Jhelum River. On the Pakistani side, it is known as "Srinagar Road." The first  of the road from Uri to Baramulla does not run along the river, but the remaining  is scenic, passing wooded mountainsides and cliffs. The road was reopened in 2005 for controlled travel by bus but again closed in 2019.

From Kupwara via Watergam
Baramulla is connected to Kupwara by National Highway NH-701 a 130-km road from Baramulla to Tangdhar passing through towns of Watergam and Handwara. The distance from Baramulla to Watergam is 15 km whereas from Baramulla to Handwara is 29 km. The distance from Kupwara to Baramulla is 47 km.

Air

Train
Baramulla is the last station on the -long Banihal-Srinagar-Baramulla railway line, opened in October 2009, connecting with Srinagar, Qazigund and Banihal across the Pir Panjal mountains through the -long Banihal railway tunnel. The Jammu–Baramulla line is planned to connect with the Indian Railways Network.

See also
Jammu and Kashmir
Baramulla district
Gulmarg

References

 Directory of Statistics, Jammu and Kashmir (2009)

 
Cities and towns in Baramulla district
Cities in Jammu and Kashmir